Aiome Airport  is an airport in Aiome, Papua New Guinea.

Airlines and destinations

References

External links
 

Airports in Papua New Guinea
Gulf Province